Telesp - Telecomunicações de São Paulo S.A. was the telephony operator of the Telebrás system in the Brazilian state of São Paulo, successor to the Companhia Telefônica Brasileira (CTB), later incorporating the Companhia de Telecomunicações do Estado de São Paulo (COTESP) and other smaller companies. It remained active from May 1973 until the privatization process in July 1998, when it was acquired by the Spanish company Telefónica, forming Telefônica Brasil, which in 2012 adopted the Vivo brand for its fixed-line operations.

References

External links
 The company's home page 

Telecommunications companies of Brazil
Telefónica
Defunct companies of Brazil